Louis Munzinger (November 25, 1851, New York City – May 20, 1916, New York) was an American businessman and politician from New York.

Life
He graduated from Grammar School No. 45. Then he engaged in bottling mineral water.

He was a port warden of the Port of New York from 1892 to 1895; and a member of the New York State Senate (16th D.) from 1896 to 1900, sitting in the 119th, 120th, 121st, 122nd, 123rd New York State Legislatures.

He was City Marshal for the collection of arrears in personal taxes from before 1903 until after 1907.

Sources

 The New York Red Book compiled by Edgar L. Murlin (published by James B. Lyon, Albany NY, 1897; pg. 163f and 404)
 FOR CONSOLATION PRIZES in NYT on December 27, 1903
 FEES ILLEGAL, SAYS ELLISON in NYT on April 13, 1907

1851 births
1916 deaths
Democratic Party New York (state) state senators
Businesspeople from New York City
Politicians from New York City
19th-century American businesspeople